The insular region of Colombia includes the oceanic islands outside the continental territory.  In the Caribbean this includes the San Andrés and Providencia islands near Central America and the many coastal islands along mainland Colombia. In the Pacific, it includes Gorgona Island and Malpelo Island.  The ecosystems and wildlife found on these islands are the same as those found on their adjacent mainland areas.  For example, the terrestrial habitat on Gorgona Island is tropical rainforest, similar to what is found in the Pacific lowlands of mainland Colombia.

Pacific islands
 Gorgonilla Island (Isla Gorgonilla): smaller island next to Gorgona Island
 Palm Island (Isla Palma): at the mouth of Málaga Bay (Bahía Málaga)

Caribbean islands

 San Andrés and Providencia
 Archipiélago de San Bernardo
 Boquerón Island
 Cabruna Island
 Ceycén Island
 Mangle Island
 Múcura Island
 Palma Island
 Panda Island
 Santa Cruz del Islote (English: Santa Cruz Islet, an artificial island)
 Tintipán Island
 Maravilla Island
 Islas del Rosario
 Fuerte Island
 Barú Island
 Tortuguilla Island
 Tierra Bomba Island

Protected areas

 PNN Uramba Bahía Málaga
 PNN Isla Gorgona
 SFF Malpelo
 PNN Corales del Rosario y San Bernardo
 PNN Old Providence McBean Lagoon

See also
 Caribbean natural region
 Natural regions of Colombia
 Pacific/Chocó natural region

References

Natural regions of Colombia
Islands of Colombia
Geography of Colombia